Shimun Yahballaha, also designated in some modern historiographical works as Yahballaha IV, or even Yahballaha V, was Patriarch of the pro-Catholic line of primates of the Church of the East, from  1572 to  1580. In primary sources, he is mentioned as patriarch Shimun by several inscriptions dated from 1572 to 1577, while his additional name Yahballaha is recorded in a later report, submitted to Rome (1581) by metropolitan Eliya. The same report describes recently deceased patriarch Yahballaha Shimun as an elderly hierarch, who was elected to the patriarchal see sometime after the death of Abdisho IV Maron (d. 1570), but did not seek confirmation from Rome, due to his advanced age.

In spite of the lack of official confirmation from Rome, modern Chaldean Catholic Church considers him as a regular patriarch of the pro-Catholic line, but additionally holds that his predecessor was a certain Abraham.

Modern scholars have proposed various solutions for complex questions related to this patriarch. Some assumed that he was ordained bishop of Gazireh in 1556 by previous patriarch Abdisho IV, but that assumption was not confirmed by later examination of primary sources. Others proposed that at first he acted as an administrator of the patriarchal throne for several years, and place his election in 1577, or 1578. Some authors have also left opened the possibility that during the period from 1570 to 1580 there were two patriarchs, Shemon Yahbalaha (1572–1576), and Yahbalaha Shemon (1577–1579/80). Those questions remain opened, because of the fragmentary nature of primary sources.

See also
 Patriarch of the Church of the East
 List of patriarchs of the Church of the East
 List of Chaldean Catholic Patriarchs

References

Sources

External links

Chaldean Catholic Patriarchs of Babylon
16th-century Eastern Catholic archbishops
1580 deaths
Year of birth unknown
Assyrians from the Ottoman Empire
Bishops in the Ottoman Empire
16th-century people from the Ottoman Empire